Help Lesotho is a non-governmental organization that was founded in 2004 by Dr. Peg Herbert. Based in Ottawa, Canada, Help Lesotho is made up of dedicated people, working to help prevent HIV/AIDS in the country of Lesotho, which has the 2nd highest rate of infection of this disease. Lesotho is located in southern Africa and is entirely surrounded by the Republic of South Africa. Dr. Herbert started the organization after meeting a student, from Lesotho, at the University of Ottawa, where she taught a class in educational psychology. Many Canadians and Basotho have helped the organization, which has support from Canada and many other countries around the world.

Help Lesotho Mission Statement: It is the mission of Help Lesotho to mitigate the effects of HIV/AIDS by promoting education, gender equity and youth leadership development.

Project Objectives:

Promote HIV/AIDS awareness and prevention and gender equity in Lesotho;

Foster hope and motivation to the children, including school sponsorship;

Develop leadership and a sense of civic responsibility among Lesotho youth;

Provide support and education for grandmothers looking after orphans;

Twin schools and build relationships between supporting communities and the people of Lesotho;

Develop simple, low-cost, accountable, locally based and championed projects in Lesotho;

and Support Lesotho teachers and schools with programs, resources, and volunteers.

References

External links
  Official Website
 Donations

Health charities in Canada
Foreign charities operating in Lesotho
Canada–Lesotho relations
Organizations established in 2004